Secrets of the Hidden Temple is the debut studio album by American hip hop group Blac Monks, which consisted of Houston-based rappers Mr. 3-2, D.A. and Awol. It was released on September 13, 1994 through Rap-A-Lot Records. Production on the album was done by John Bido, Troy Clark and DJ Ready Red. The album peaked at number 65 on the US Billboard Top R&B/Hip-Hop Albums chart.

Track listing

Charts

References

External links
 

1994 debut albums
Rap-A-Lot Records albums
Albums produced by Mike Dean (record producer)
Blac Monks albums